Raphael Pichey Gavron (born 24 June 1989) is a British-American actor. He had supporting roles in the films Breaking and Entering (2006), Nick & Norah's Infinite Playlist (2008), A Star Is Born (2018), and the series Life Unexpected (2010) and Godfather of Harlem (2019).

Early life
Gavron was born in Hendon, London, England, the son of writer Martha Pichey and the late publisher Simon Gavron. His mother is American, and his father was British. Gavron was raised in a Jewish family in North London. His paternal grandparents were Robert Gavron, Baron Gavron, a British printing millionaire, philanthropist and Labour Life Peer, and  sociologist Hannah Fyvel, who was born in Tel Aviv and committed suicide at age 29. His great-grandfather was writer Tosco R. Fyvel, who worked with author George Orwell. His half-aunt (his father's half-sister) is director Sarah Gavron. Gavron has two younger brothers – Benjamin (born 1992) and Moses (born 1996). In 2008, Gavron volunteered at a kibbutz in Israel for six months.

Career
In Breaking and Entering, Gavron played Miro, a young burglar who uses techniques from parkour to gain access to the high-tech offices of an urban landscape architect; he performed several difficult physical feats in the film. For his role, Gavron received a nomination for the Most Promising Newcomer award at the British Independent Film Awards.

Gavron played the hired assassin Duro in the second season of HBO's Rome.  He also appeared in the 2008 release Nick and Norah's Infinite Playlist as Dev, the gay lead singer of Nick's band.

In Inkheart, a movie adaptation of the novel of the same name, Gavron played Farid, a character from The Book of One Thousand and One Nights, magically brought to life. The film was released theatrically in January 2009.

He guest starred on a few episodes of 24, as Hamid Al-Zarian, the younger brother of an assumed terrorist. He also appeared in JoJo's music video for the song "Disaster" in November 2011. Gavron played Bug (Bobby) in the TV series Life Unexpected. He was chosen as Lux's long known friend and also Lux's boyfriend.

In 2013, he co-starred in Snitch, playing the son of Dwayne Johnson's character. His next film roles were in the action adventure Tracers (2015) and the drama The Land (2016).

Filmography

Film

Television

References

External links

1989 births
21st-century English male actors
British emigrants to the United States
British Jews
English male television actors
English male film actors
English people of American descent
English people of Belarusian-Jewish descent
English people of French-Canadian descent
English people of Israeli descent
English people of Lithuanian-Jewish descent
English people of Russian-Jewish descent
Rafi Gavron
Jewish British male actors
Living people
People from Hendon